The 2020 elections for the Pennsylvania House of Representatives was held on November 3, 2020, with all districts being decided. The term of office for those that were elected in 2020 began when the House of Representatives convened in January 2021. Pennsylvania State Representatives were elected for two-year terms, with all 203 seats up for election every two years. The election was coincided with the 2020 United States presidential election, United States House of Representatives elections,  and one-half of the State Senate.

Republicans have controlled the chamber since 2010. In October 2020, The Washington Post identified this state election as one of eight whose outcomes could affect partisan balance during post-census redistricting.

Special elections

8th legislative district 
In the 2019 elections, Republican state representative Tedd Nesbit was elected to be a judge on the Mercer County Court of Common Pleas. A special election for the 8th legislative district was held on March 17 to fill his seat.

Democrats selected business owner Phil Heasley as their nominee, while Republicans nominated attorney Timothy R. Bonner. Bonner won the special election in the heavily Republican district.

18th legislative district 
In the 2019 elections, Republican state representative Gene DiGirolamo was elected to be a Bucks County commissioner. A special election for the 18th legislative district was held on March 17 to fill his seat.

Democrats selected union plumber Harold Hayes as their nominee. Republicans nominated Kathleen "KC" Tomlinson, a funeral director and daughter of State Senator Tommy Tomlinson. Both candidates also ran for their respective party's nomination for the general election.

After arguments by Democrats over holding this election during the COVID-19 pandemic, Tomlinson won the special election.

58th legislative district 
In the 2019 elections, Republican state representative Justin Walsh was elected to be a judge on the Westmoreland County Court of Common Pleas. A special election for the 58th legislative district was held on March 17 to fill his seat.

Democrats selected former Smithton mayor Robert Prah Jr. as their nominee, while Republicans nominated union carpenter Eric Davanzo. Both candidates also ran for their respective party's nomination for the general election. Davanzo won the special election.

190th legislative district 
Democratic State Representative Movita Johnson-Harrell, elected to the seat in a 2019 special election, resigned her seat after less than a year upon being charged with stealing from her own charity. A special election for the 190th legislative district was held on February 25 to fill Johnson-Harrell's vacancy.

Democrats selected local SEIU business agent G. Roni Green as their nominee, and Republicans nominated businesswoman Wanda Logan. Green easily won this heavily Democratic district.

==Predictions==

General election results overview

Close races
Districts where the margin of victory was under 10%:

Results by district

Source:

Notes

Partisan clients

See also
 2020 Pennsylvania elections
 Elections in Pennsylvania

References

Further reading
 . (About redistricting).

External links
 
 
 
  (State affiliate of the U.S. League of Women Voters)
 

2020 Pennsylvania elections
2020
Pennsylvania House